Kandyohal is a village in Mandi district in the Indian state of Himachal Pradesh.

Villages in Mandi district